The Holden One Tonner is a cab chassis utility vehicle that was produced by Holden, the Australian subsidiary of General Motors (GM) between 1971 an 1984, and again between 2003 and 2005.

First generation (HQ/HJ/HX/HZ/WB): cab chassis version of the Holden (HQ/HJ/HX/HZ/WB) utility.
Second generation (VY II/VZ): cab chassis version of the Holden Ute (VY II/VZ).

References 

 Holden vehicles
General Motors vehicles